Edward Colt may refer to:

Edward Colt, of the Colt baronets
Edward Colt, character in Wimbledon (film)